Alf Martinius Lagesen (24 June 1897 – 13 February 1973) was a Norwegian footballer who played as a goalkeeper for Drammens BK and the Norwegian national team.

Lagesen played one international match, a friendly in 1920 against Sweden in Stockholm. He was in the Norwegian squad at the Antwerp Olympics the same year where he was reserve goalkeeper behind Sigurd Wathne, but he did not play in any matches.

Lagesen was also a referee and officiated the 1921 Norwegian Football Cup final. He was later chairman of Drammens BK.

References

External links 
 
 

1897 births
1973 deaths
Sportspeople from Drammen
Norwegian footballers
Norway international footballers
Norwegian football referees
Association football goalkeepers